The Volkswagen Lavida is a compact car manufactured by the German automobile manufacturer Volkswagen. Originally launched at Auto China 2008 in Beijing, the Lavida is considered the first mass-produced Volkswagen small family car to be mainly designed by its Chinese partner. In 2010, the car was the number one seller in China, with 251,615 vehicles delivered.



First generation (Typ 18; 2008) 

The first generation Lavida is based on the Volkswagen Group PQ34 platform (PQ34L) and competes with a similar Chinese Volkswagen models produced by FAW-Volkswagen which is the Bora.

At launch, it was equipped with two engine options, which were 1.6-litre or 2.0-litre. The Lavida 1.4 TSI Sport was added to the range at Auto Shanghai 2009, which uses the same engine as the Sagitar TSI and equipped with either the 5-speed manual transmission or the 7-speed DSG transmission.

Up to the replacement in April 2012, the Lavida sold more than 700,000 units. In July 2015, Volkswagen launched a 'New Lavida' with a redesigned exterior, but more notchback than the first generation Lavida resembling a fastback.

Engines
The Lavida has three engine options: the 1.4-litre turbo, 1.6-litre and 2.0-litre petrol engine. The 1.6-litre engine also powers the Polo Mk4 sedan, while the 2.0-litre engine powers the Volkswagen Passat. The 1.4 TSI engine is shared with the Sagitar, Magotan, Golf Mk6 and Bora. The 2.0-litre engine was dropped in the facelift model of 2012.

E-Lavida
In 2010, Shanghai Volkswagen unveiled an E-Lavida concept car at Auto China 2010, though no details of production have been forthcoming.

Gallery

Second generation (Typ 18; 2012) 

The range was significantly updated in 2012, with the launch of the New Lavida at the Beijing Auto Show. The 1.4-litre and 1.6-litre engines were carried over, and the 2.0-litre engine  option was axed. The new Lavida is more notchback-looking than the first generation.

The new Lavida retains the 2,610 mm wheelbase, but is slightly lower, shorter and wider. It is built on the platform of the first generation Škoda Octavia and has an extended wheelbase. A new model called the Lavida Lang Xing was introduced as the hatchback variant of the New Lavida.

In May 2018, the Lavida, along with the Tiguan, Santana, and Lamando, was launched in the Philippines as part of the new ASEAN-China Free Trade Agreement (ACFTA).

Gran Lavida (2013–2017)
The Volkswagen Gran Lavida is a compact estate produced by Shanghai Volkswagen in its Anting plant. Marketed as a hatchback, it was launched in May 2013, replacing the Lavida Sport saloon.

In the mid-2012, the Audi A3 Sportback 8P was used as base for the technical development of a new model. In November, the first test vehicles were seen on Chinese roads. The cars were named Škoda Sportback and had a typical Škoda grille and bumpers using the typical Audi A3 like headlamps. The taillights were resembled that from the Škoda Octavia II Combi.

The production version of the Gran Lavida was presented in April 2013 at the Shanghai Auto Show. The car adapted the sedan Lavida styling, apart from the B-pillar rearwards. According to initial information, the Gran Lavida was equipped 1.4-litre engine as standard, followed by a 1.8-litre engine and a 2.0-litre as the top engine. A crossover-themed variant of the Gran Lavida called the Cross Lavida commenced production in November 2013.

Third generation (Typ 0C; 2018) 

The third generation Lavida was launched at Auto China 2018 in Beijing, and is based on the Volkswagen Group MQB platform. At launch, it was equipped with two engine options including the 1.5-litre petrol engine with 116 hp or 1.4-litre TSI petrol engine with 150 hp, mated to a five-speed manual gearbox or a six-speed automatic gearbox. It also received an extended 78 mm wheelbase compared to the previous generation.

The Gran Lavida compact estate based on the third generation Lavida was also available at launch. Although offered only from 2018 to 2019.

2022 facelift
The third generation Lavida received a facelift for the 2022 model year. The facelift includes a restyled front end and rear bumper with a slightly revised interior. The 280 TSI models are equipped with a 1.4-litre TSI engine with 150 hp, mated to a DSG gearbox, with a 1.5-litre engine producing 113 hp also available.

Sales

References

External links

 

Lavida
Cars of China
SAIC Motor vehicles
Compact cars
Sedans
Hatchbacks
Station wagons
2000s cars
2010s cars
Front-wheel-drive vehicles